The "figurative system of human knowledge", sometimes known as the tree of Diderot and d'Alembert, was a tree developed to represent the structure of knowledge itself, produced for the Encyclopédie by Jean le Rond d'Alembert and Denis Diderot.

The tree was a taxonomy of human knowledge, inspired by Francis Bacon's The Advancement of Learning. The three main branches of knowledge in the tree are: "Memory"/History, "Reason"/Philosophy, and "Imagination"/Poetry.

Notable is the fact that theology is ordered under 'Philosophy'. The historian Robert Darnton has argued that this categorization of religion as being subject to human reason, and not a source of knowledge in and of itself (revelation), was a significant factor in the controversy surrounding the work.  Additionally notice that 'Knowledge of God' is only a few nodes away from 'Divination' and 'Black Magic'.

The original version, in French, can be seen in the graphic on the right. An image of the diagram with English translations superimposed over the French text is available. Another example of English translation of the tree is available in literature (see the reference by Schwab). Below is a version of it rendered in English as a bulleted outline.

The Tree of Diderot and d'Alembert 
"Detailed System of Human Knowledge"
from the Encyclopédie.
 Understanding
 Memory.
 History.
 Sacred (History of Prophets).
 Ecclesiastical.
 Civil, Ancient and Modern.
 Civil History, properly said. (See also: History of civil society)
 Literary History.
 Memoirs.
 Antiquities. (See also: Classical antiquity)
 Complete Histories.
 Natural.
 Uniformity of Nature. (See: Uniformitarianism)
 Celestial History.
 History...
 of Meteors.
 of the Earth and the Sea (See also: Origin of water on Earth)
 of Minerals. (See also:  Geological history of Earth)
 of Vegetables. (See also: History of agriculture)
 of Animals.  (See also: Evolutionary history of life)
 of the Elements. (See also: Classical element, History of alchemy, and History of chemistry)
 Deviations of Nature.
 Celestial Wonders.
 Large Meteors. (See also: Asteroids)
 Wonders of Land and Sea. (See: Wonders of the World)
 Monstrous Minerals.
 Monstrous Vegetables. (See: Largest plants, Poisonous plants, and Carnivorous plants)
 Monstrous Animals. (See: Largest animals and Predators)
 Wonders of the Elements. (See: Natural disasters)
 Uses of Nature (See Technology and Applied sciences)
 Arts, Crafts, Manufactures.
 Work and Uses of Gold and Silver.
 Minting.
 Goldsmith.
 Gold Spinning.
 Gold Drawing.
 Silversmith
 Planisher, etc.
 Work and Uses of Precious Stones.
 Lapidary.
 Diamond cutting.
 Jeweler, etc.
 Work and Uses of Iron.
 Large Forges.
 Locksmith.
 Tool Making.
 Armorer.
 Gun Making, etc.
 Work and Uses of Glass.
 Glassmaking.
 Plate-Glassmaking.
 Mirror Making.
 Optician.
 Glazier, etc.
 Work and Uses of Skin.
 Tanner.
 Chamois Maker.
 Leather Merchant.
 Glove Making, etc.
 Work and Uses of Stone, Plaster, Slate, etc.
 Practical Architecture.
 Practical Sculpture.
 Mason.
 Tiler, etc.
 Work and Uses of Silk.
 Spinning.
 Milling.
 Work like.
 Velvet.
 Brocaded Fabrics, etc.
 Work and Uses of Wool.
 Cloth-Making.
 Bonnet-Making, etc.
 Working and Uses, etc.
 Reason
 Philosophy
 General Metaphysics, or Ontology, or Science of Being in General, of Possibility, of Existence, of Duration, etc.
 Science of God.
 Natural Theology.
 Revealed Theology.
 Science of Good and Evil Spirits.
 Divination.
 Black Magic.
 Science of Man.
 Pneumatology or Science of the Soul.
 Reasonable.
 Sensible.
 Logic.
 Art of Thinking.
 Apprehension.
 Science of Ideas
 Judgement.
 Science of Propositions.
 Reasoning.
 Induction.
 Method.
 Demonstration.
 Analysis.
 Synthesis.
 Art of Remembering.
 Memory.
 Natural.
 Artificial.
 Prenotion.
 Emblem.
 Supplement to Memory.
 Writing.
 Printing.
 Alphabet.
 Cipher.
 Arts of Writing, Printing, Reading, Deciphering.
 Orthography.
 Art of Communication
 Science of the Instrument of Discourse.
 Grammar.
 Signs.
 Gesture.
 Pantomime.
 Declamation.
 Characters.
 Ideograms.
 Hieroglyphics.
 Heraldry or Blazonry.
 Prosody.
 Construction.
 Syntax.
 Philology.
 Critique.
 Pedagogy.
 Choice of Studies.
 Manner of Teaching.
 Science of Qualities of Discourse.
 Rhetoric.
 Mechanics of Poetry.
 Ethics.
 General.
 General Science of Good and Evil, of duties in general, of Virtue, of the necessity of being Virtuous, etc.
 Particular.
 Science of Laws or Jurisprudence.
 Natural.
 Economic. (See also commercial law)
 Political. (See also political law)
 Internal and External. (See also foreign policy)
 Commerce on Land and Sea.
 Science of Nature
 Metaphysics of Bodies or, General Physics, of Extent, of Impenetrability, of Movement, of Word, etc.
 Mathematics.
 Pure.
 Arithmetic.
 Numeric.
 Algebra.
 Elementary.
 Infinitesimal.
 Differential.
 Integral.
 Geometry.
 Elementary (Military Architecture, Tactics).
 Transcendental (Theory of Courses).
 Mixed.
 Mechanics.
 Statics.
 Statics, properly said.
 Hydrostatics.
 Dynamics.
 Dynamics, properly said.
 Ballistics.
 Hydrodynamics.
 Hydraulics.
 Navigation, Naval Architecture.
 Geometric Astronomy.
 Cosmography.
 Uranography.
 Geography.
 Hydrography.
 Chronology.
 Gnomonics.
 Optics.
 Optics, properly said.
 Dioptrics, Perspective.
 Catoptrics.
 Acoustics.
 Pneumatics.
 Art of Conjecture. Analysis of Chance.
 Physicomathematics.
 Particular Physics.
 Zoology.
 Anatomy.
 Simple.
 Comparative.
 Physiology.
 Medicine.
 Hygiene.
 Hygiene, properly said.
 Cosmetics (Orthopedics).
 Athletics (Gymnastics).
 Pathology.
 Semiotics.
 Treatment.
 Diete.
 Surgery.
 Pharmacy.
 Veterinary Medicine.
 Horse Management.
 Hunting.
 Fishing.
 Falconry.
 Physical Astronomy.
 Astrology.
 Judiciary Astrology.
 Physical Astrology.
 Meteorology.
 Cosmology.
 Uranology.
 Aerology.
 Geology.
 Hydrology.
 Botany.
 Agriculture.
 Gardening.
 Mineralogy.
 Chemistry.
 Chemistry, properly said, (Pyrotechnics, Dyeing, etc.).
 Metallurgy.
 Alchemy.
 Natural Magic.
 Imagination.
 Poetry.
 Sacred, Profane.
 Narrative.
 Epic Poem
 Madrigal
 Epigram
 Novel, etc.
 Dramatic
 Tragedy
 Comedy
 Pastoral, etc.
 Parable
 Allegory
(NOTE: THIS NEXT BRANCH SEEMS TO BELONG TO BOTH THE NARRATIVE AND DRAMATIC TREE AS DEPICTED BY THE LINE DRAWN CONNECTING THE TWO.)
 Music
 Theoretical
 Practical (see also musical technique)
 Instrumental
 Vocal
 Painting
 Sculpture
 Engraving

See also 
 Classification chart
 Instauratio magna
 Propædia
 Pierre Mouchon

References

Further reading 
 Robert Darnton, "Epistemological angst: From encyclopedism to advertising," in Tore Frängsmyr, ed., The structure of knowledge: classifications of science and learning since the Renaissance (Berkeley, CA: Office for the History of Science and Technology, University of California, Berkeley, 2001).
 Adams, David (2006) 'The Système figuré des Connaissances humaines and the structure of Knowledge in the Encyclopédie',  in Ordering the World, ed. Diana Donald and Frank O'Gorman, London: Macmillan, p. 190-215. 
 Preliminary discourse to the Encyclopedia of Diderot, Jean Le Rond d'Alembert, translated by Richard N. Schwab, 1995.

External links

 The Tree translated into English
 ESSAI D'UNE DISTRIBUTION GÉNÉALOGIQUE DES SCIENCES ET DES ARTS PRINCIPAUX, published as a fold-out frontispiece in volume 1 of Pierre Mouchon, Table analytique et raisonnée des matieres contenues dans les XXXIII volumes in-folio du Dictionnaire des sciences, des arts et des métiers, et dans son supplément, Paris, Panckoucke 1780.

Taxonomy
Age of Enlightenment
Trees (data structures)
Knowledge representation